St. Paraskevi's Church is a church in Selckë, Gjirokastër County, Albania. It became a Cultural Monument of Albania in 1970.

References

Cultural Monuments of Albania
Buildings and structures in Dropull